Exchange Place may refer to:
Exchange Place, New Orleans, a pedestrian mall in Louisiana
Exchange Place (Boston), an office building complex in Massachusetts
Exchange Place  (Jersey City), a district and neighborhood in New Jersey
Exchange Place (PATH station)
Exchange Place (PRR station), a former railroad station
Exchange Place (HBLR station)
Exchange Place (Manhattan), a street in New York City
Exchange Place Historic District, a historic district in Salt Lake City, Utah